Amphipterygium is a small genus in the subfamily Anacardioideae of the cashew and sumac family Anacardiaceae.

Species
The Plant List and Catalogue of Life recognise 5 accepted species:
 Amphipterygium adstringens 
 Amphipterygium amplifolium 
 Amphipterygium glaucum 
 Amphipterygium molle 
 Amphipterygium simplicifolium

References

Anacardiaceae
Anacardiaceae genera